The St. Louis City Hall was designed by architects Eckel and Mann, the winners of a national competition.  Construction began in July 1890 and completed in 1904.  Its profile and stylistic characteristics evoke the French Renaissance Hôtel de Ville, Paris, with an elaborate interior decorated with marble and gold trim.

Continuously occupied by the city since its opening, the building houses the offices of the Mayor of St. Louis, the Board of Aldermen and the St. Louis Department of Public Safety. The majority of government meetings occur there, most of which are open to the public. It was designated a St. Louis City Landmark in 1971.

City offices 

City offices housed in the building include:

 St. Louis Department of Public Safety
 St. Louis Board of Aldermen
 St. Louis City Recorder of Deeds and Vital Records Registrar
 St Louis City Collector of Revenue
 Office of the Treasurer
 St Louis City Assessor

References

External links
 
 
 
 

Government of St. Louis
1890 establishments in Missouri
Government buildings completed in 1904
City halls in Missouri
Downtown St. Louis
Buildings and structures in St. Louis
Landmarks of St. Louis